Microfibrillar-associated protein 5 is a protein that in humans is encoded by the MFAP5 gene.

This gene encodes a 25-kD microfibril-associated glycoprotein which is rich in serine and threonine residues. It lacks a hydrophobic carboxyl terminus and proline-, glutamine-, and tyrosine-rich regions, which are characteristics of a related 31-kDa microfibril-associated glycoprotein (MFAP2). The close similarity between these two proteins is confined to a central region of 60 aa where precise alignment of 7 cysteine residues occurs. The structural differences suggest that this encoded protein has some functions that are distinct from those of MFAP2.

References

Further reading